Joseph Yang may refer to:

Joseph Steven Yang (born 1968), South Korean-born American actor
Joseph Yang Yongqiang (born 1970), Chinese Roman Catholic priest

See also
Joseph Young (disambiguation)